The Elma Roane Fieldhouse is a 2,565-seat arena in Memphis, Tennessee. It is the home of the University of Memphis Tigers women's basketball and volleyball teams.  Prior to moving to the Mid-South Coliseum  in 1966, it was also home to the men's basketball team as well.  The arena opened in 1929 and is named after Elma Roane, a former coach and administrator of the Tigers women's teams who helped return women's sports to varsity status in 1972–73.

See also
 List of NCAA Division I basketball arenas

References
Venue information

Indoor arenas in Tennessee
Memphis Tigers basketball venues
Sports venues in Memphis, Tennessee
College basketball venues in the United States
Basketball venues in Tennessee